The Seljuk campaigns in the Aegean refer to the ground and naval actions conducted by the Seljuk Turks, chiefly under the leadership of Tzachas of Smyrna against the Byzantine Empire. A fierce opponent, Tzachas constructed the first Turkish navy and captured a few Aegean islands, supplemented by the conquest of Smyrna and Abydos. In the aftermath of the First Crusade Alexios I launched a counter-attack which regained the territories lost. Alexios was also able to rapidly quell the threat of Abu'l Qasim, the Seljuk governor of Nicaea, who attempted to create a fleet of his own at Abydos in ca. 1090.

Tzachas recovered from his first defeat and retook several islands, but was definitively defeated at Lesbos by Constantine Dalassenos and John Doukas in 1092. His capital, Smyrna, and most of the Aegean coastline were recovered by Doukas in 1097, ending the Turks' direct access to the Aegean.

Alexios I Komnenos' son, John II Komnenos inherited a sizable amount of land in Western Asia Minor, although the port city of Antalya was under Seljuk siege. Nonetheless, John's tireless campaigns drove the Turks deep into Anatolia and by 1143 the Seljuk Turks had lost all control of the coastal regions of Asia Minor. The Byzantines under Manuel I Komnenos could muster some 200 ships. Not until the demise of the Comnenian dynasty would the Turks capture a port and it was Umur of Aydın in c. 14th century that constituted the first Turkish threat to Christian shipping in the Aegean since the 11th century.

See also 
 Byzantine navy
 Battle of Koyun Islands

Aegean
11th century in the Byzantine Empire
Alexios I Komnenos
1080s conflicts
1090s conflicts
Medieval Aegean Sea
11th century in the Seljuk Empire